Gabriel or Gavril Movilă (? – December 1635) was Prince of Wallachia from June 1618 to July 1620. A Movileşti boyar, Gabriel was a son of Simion Movilă, Prince of Moldavia.

Biography 

He attained the throne of Wallachia in 1616 but he remained unrecognized by the Ottoman government that preferred Alexandru IV Iliaş. He obtained his appointment in June 1618 but was replaced in July 1620 by Radu IX Mihnea.

He retired to Transylvania where he died. He had married a Hungarian noble Erzébet Zolyomy. The couple probably remained childless.

References

Bibliography 

 
 
 

Movila, Simion
Year of death unknown
Year of birth unknown